Upper Kananaskis Lake is a natural lake that was turned into a reservoir in Kananaskis Country in Alberta, Canada.

Upper Kananaskis Lake, along with the Lower Kananaskis Lake, is located in Peter Lougheed Provincial Park .

The lake is part of a series of natural and man made lakes in the Kananaskis and Bow Valleys used for hydro electric power, flood control, and water reserves for the Bow River water users such as the city of Calgary.

The lake is also used for recreational activities, with hiking paths surrounding the lake (and cross-country skiing trails in the winter).

Hiking trails
Upper Kananaskis Lake Circuit
Rawson Lake Trail
Aster Lake Route (also goes to Hidden Lake)
Three Isle Lake Trail
Maude-Lawson Trail (To Lawson Lake)
Mount Indefatigable Trail
Elk Pass Trail (To Fox, Frozen, Upper Elk, and Lower Elk Lakes)
Northover Ridge Route

Climate

Based on the Köppen climate classification, this vicinity is located in a subarctic climate with cold, snowy winters, and mild summers.

Gallery

References

Kananaskis Lake, Upper
Kananaskis Lake, Upper
Kananaskis Improvement District